Theclopsis leos is a Neotropical butterfly in the family Lycaenidae.

References

Theclinae